AFCA may refer to:

Organizations
 A.F.C.A (clothing), a brand of urban lifestyle clothing founded by the late Sven Westendorp
 American Foundation for Children with AIDS, a non-profit organization that helps children in sub-Saharan Africa
 Australian Film Critics Association, professional association for film critics, reviewers and journalists
 Australian Financial Complaints Authority, an external dispute resolution scheme for consumers
 Cyberspace Capabilities Center (previously the Air Force Communications Agency), the organization for cyber IT requirements in the US Air Force

Sports
 A.F.C.A (hooligans), a Dutch hooligan firm linked to A.F.C. Ajax
 AFCA Supportersclub, an independent and official supporters' association linked to AFC Ajax football club
 American Football Coaches Association, an association of over 11,000 American football coaches and staff